Sarisophora idonea is a moth in the family Lecithoceridae. It was described by Chun-Sheng Wu in 1994. It is found in China.

References

Moths described in 1994
Sarisophora